Emin Sabitoglu (real name Emin Sabit oghlu Mahmudov; 2 November 1937 – 18 November 2000) was a Soviet Azerbaijani composer, author of a lot of well-known Azerbaijani songs and music for films. People's actor of Azerbaijan.

Biography
Emin Sabitoglu was born on 2 November 1937, in the family of Azerbaijani writer Sabit Rahman. After graduation from musical school in Baku, he entered Gara Garayev’s class at Baku Conservatoire, in 1954. Two years later he was transferred to Moscow State Conservatory named after Tchaikovsky (Yuri Shaporin’s class). In 1961, he began to work as music editor in film studio “Azerbaijanfilm". In consecutive years he worked as art director of the State Philarmony, and also taught at State Conservatory named after Uzeyir Hajibeyov. He wrote poems for several pieces of music. However, several music genres have been the major part in his works. He composed more than 600 songs, 9 musical comedies and pieces of music for nearly 40 films. He has numerous compositions written for plays. The composer himself does not know exactly. Along with theatres in Baku, he composed music for theatres in Sumgayit, Ganja, Lankaran, Mingachevir, and Nakchivan.

Emin Sabitoglu died on 18 November 2000 in Baku.

Creativity
Emin Sabitoglu is the author of a lot of works in different music genres. Particularly, he is the author of one symphony, three symphonic poems, three cantatas, string quartet and a poem for violin and fortepiano. But some music genres make up the main part of his creativity. He is the author of more than 600 songs, nine musical comedies, author of songs for many films. Besides that, Emin Sabitoglu created a large number of musical compositions for theatrical spectacles.

Family 
 Emin Sabitoglu is writer Sabit Rahman's and Ismat khanum Iravanski's son. Ismat Khanum Iravanski was from House of Iravanski. 
 Musician, Jeyran Mahmudova is his daughter. 
 His wife is singer, Khadija Abbasova

References

Azerbaijani composers
Musicians from Baku
Azerbaijani film score composers
Soviet film score composers
Male film score composers
Baku Academy of Music alumni
People's Artists of Azerbaijan
Soviet Azerbaijani people
1937 births
2000 deaths
20th-century classical composers
Male classical composers
Moscow Conservatory alumni
20th-century male musicians
Burials at II Alley of Honor